Charles Storer may refer to:
 Charles Storer, an American painter
 Charlie Storer, an English footballer